The Markazii Tojikiston Stadium, also known as Pamir Stadium or Central Tajikistan Stadium is a multi-purpose stadium in Dushanbe, Tajikistan. It is currently used mostly for football matches. The stadium currently holds 20,000. It is currently the home ground of the Tajikistan national football team, Istiqlol Dushanbe and CSKA Pamir Dushanbe. It also hosted Afghanistan national football team matches in 2022 World Cup qualification.

Next to it is located the Dushanbe Zoo.

References

External links
 Stadium Database: Pamir Stadium
 Stadium Profile at FC Istiklol

Football venues in Tajikistan
Athletics (track and field) venues in Tajikistan
Buildings and structures in Dushanbe
Tajikistan
Multi-purpose stadiums
Sport in Dushanbe